The 1982 Fiji rugby union tour of Great Britain and Canada was a series of matches played between September and October 1982 and by Fiji national rugby union team, in Scotland, England and Canada.

A match against Scotland and another against England were played, but Scottish Rugby Union and Rugby Football Union did not award full international caps.

Results 
Scores and results list Fiji's points tally first.

Sources

Fiji
Fiji national rugby union team tours
tour
tour
Rugby union tours of Canada
Rugby union tours of England
Rugby union tours of Scotland
1982 in Canadian rugby union